Manchet, manchette or michette, is a wheaten, yeast-leavened bread of very good quality, or a small flat circular loaf. It was a bread that was small enough to be held in the hand.

History

One of the first recipes printed in English for manchet breads comes from 1588 and the recipe book The Good Huswifes Handmaide by an unknown author. In it the author explains that the flour must be fine and have been boulted twice.

There are several recipes for manchets mentioned in Florence White's classic English cuisine book Good Things in England first published in 1932. She gives five regional varieties of the bread and quotes from sources for the recipes. The first is from Gervase Markham in Nottinghamshire published in 1615 where White quotes an anonymous source that describes a manchet as 'Your best and principal bread'. Gervase Markham writes that the dough should be kneaded by hand and with the brake, and if no brake is available, wrapped in a cloth and trodden underfoot.
 
There is also a reference to "Manchetts for the Queen's Maides", a royal ordinance originating from Eltham Palace in 1526 during Henry VIII's reign which describes a menu for medieval aristocracy. It is inserted because a correspondent had requested when manchets were to be served at court. This suggests that in origin it was a luxurious bread containing ingredients that were available only to the wealthy. The most superior wheat for a manchet was said to come from Heston, near Hounslow during the reign of Elizabeth I.

Breakfast in the household of Henry Percy, 9th Earl of Northumberland, according to the household accounts from 1564 to 1632, for the earl and his lady on a flesh day was "a loofe of bred in trenchors, 2 manchets, 1 quart bere, 1 quart wyne, a Chyne of Muton or Chyne of Beef Boilid." The two older sons had "2 loaf of household Breid, a Manchet, 1 Potell [two quarts] of Bere, a Chekynge [chicken] or ells 3 mutton Bonys boyled."

Florence White makes reference to three contemporary versions: the Cornish manchet, a version from the Isle of Wight, and a recipe from Sussex for "Lady Arundel's Manchet" which is notable for the inclusion of butter, eggs, and milk. The recipe for  Lady Arundel's manchet was first published in 1653  in A True Gentlewoman's Delight, printed for the Countess of Kent.

Manchets crossed the Atlantic to Virginia with the early colonists. Manchets are little made today with the traditional Bath bun and Sally Lunn bun amongst the best-known contemporary styles still made commercially. According to Elizabeth David, only the wealthy could have manchets for their breakfast or dinner and these became the "ancestors" of eighteenth-century French rolls.

In popular culture
In series 3 of the television series The Great British Bake-off , Cathryn Dresser from Sussex made Lady Arundel's manchets, serving them with an inner layer of cream and jam.

See also

 List of British breads
 List of sweet breads

References

External links
 Sca Cooking
 Manchets at The Foods of England Project

Yeast breads
Medieval cuisine
British breads
Sweet breads